Arthur Peter Keaveney (8 July 1951 – 23 June 2020) was an Irish historian.

Biography 
Keaveney was born in Galway and was educated there (St Joseph's Patrician College and University College Galway). In 1975 he moved to Hull University to work on PhD on Lucius Cornelius Sulla, which was later expanded and published as a book.

Keaveney was a Doctoral fellow at University of Wales, Aberystwyth, from 1978 to 1979. From 1979 to 2014, he was a lecturer and reader in ancient history at the University of Kent, specialising in Republican Rome and Achaemenid Persia. According to Herbert Heftner, his second edition of a biography of Sulla, published in 2005, is one of the works "to which we owe significant advances in knowledge of Roman history around the turn of the 2nd to the 1st century BC." His Lucullus biography has been translated into Polish.

In 2013, Keaveney was an honorary president of the Classical Association of Ireland. He remained an emeritus reader at the University of Kent after retirement and continued his research, which included Achaemenid Persia and the miracles of Thomas Becket as depicted in the Canterbury Cathedral  windows. He was working on a monograph on the Persian court at the time of his death.

Keaveney died from COVID-19 during the COVID-19 pandemic in the Republic of Ireland on 23 June 2020.

Selected bibliography 
 Sulla. The Last Republican. London 1982.
 Rome and Unification of Italy. London 1987.
 Lucullus. A Life. London 1992.
 The life and journey of Athenian statesman Themistocles (524-460-B.C.?) as a refugee in Persia. Lewiston, 2003. 
 The army in the Roman revolution. London 2007.
 (with Madden, J.) Sir William Herbert Ad Campianum Iesuitam Eiusque Rationes Decem Responsio. Georg Olms Verlag, 2009.
 The Persian Invasions of Greece. Barnsley, 2011.

References

1951 births
2020 deaths
Academics of the University of Kent
Alumni of the University of Galway
Deaths from the COVID-19 pandemic in the Republic of Ireland
Historians of ancient Rome
People educated at St Joseph's Patrician College
20th-century Irish historians
21st-century Irish historians